Rasa Singh Rawat (1 October 1941 – 10 May 2021) was an Indian politician.

Biography
He has been a member of the 9th, 10th, 11th, 13th and the 14th Lok Sabha of India, representing the Ajmer constituency in the state of Rajasthan. He was a member of the Bharatiya Janata Party (BJP). Rawat died on 10 May 2021 of COVID-19 in Ajmer during the COVID-19 pandemic in India.

References

External links
 Official biographical sketch in Parliament of India website

1941 births
2021 deaths
Rajasthani politicians
University of Rajasthan alumni
India MPs 2004–2009
People from Ajmer
India MPs 1989–1991
India MPs 1991–1996
India MPs 1996–1997
India MPs 1999–2004
People from Rajsamand district
Lok Sabha members from Rajasthan
Bharatiya Janata Party politicians from Rajasthan
Deaths from the COVID-19 pandemic in India